Rudolf Antonius "Ruud" Misdorp (born 3 July 1952) is a former water polo player from the Netherlands, who participated in two Summer Olympics. On both occasions, at the 1980 Summer Olympics in Moscow and the 1984 Summer Olympics in Los Angeles, he finished in sixth position with the Dutch national team.

See also
 Netherlands men's Olympic water polo team records and statistics
 List of men's Olympic water polo tournament goalkeepers

References

External links
 

1952 births
Living people
Sportspeople from The Hague
Dutch male water polo players
Water polo goalkeepers
Olympic water polo players of the Netherlands
Water polo players at the 1980 Summer Olympics
Water polo players at the 1984 Summer Olympics
20th-century Dutch people